is a Japanese cinematographer whose works include Silver Linings Playbook (2012), Warrior (2011) and The Grey (2011).

Life and career
Takayanagi was raised in Tomioka, a city in Gunma Prefecture. He briefly attended Tohoku University in Japan before deciding to pursue a career in cinematography in the American film industry; he was inspired by Masters of Light: Conversations with Contemporary Cinematographers, which he saw in a bookstore. He migrated to the United States around 1996 in order to attend film school at California State University, Long Beach at the university's Film and Electronics Arts Department, although he could not speak English at the time. He later attended the AFI Conservatory in Los Angeles and graduated in 2002. His short film Shui Hen, a graduate project he produced at the AFI Conservatory, won the 2003 Palm Springs International Film Festival's award for Best Student Cinematography. In 2004, he was awarded the American Society of Cinematographers' John F. Seitz Student Heritage Award.

After working on the film crews of various low-budget projects, in 2005 Takayanagi was hired as a Tokyo-based second unit cinematographer for the film Babel under Rodrigo Prieto. He later photographed the second units of State of Play, Eat Pray Love, The Eagle, and Monte Carlo. His first turn as a main unit cinematographer was on Meet Monica Velour, followed by The Grey, both released in 2011. In 2012, he was named one of Variety magazine's "10 Cinematographers to Watch". He photographed David O. Russell's 2012 film Silver Linings Playbook, followed by Out of the Furnace in 2013 and Rupert Goold's 2015 film True Story.

In 2015, Takayanagi became a member of the American Society of Cinematographers.

Filmography

Film

References

External links

Living people
Japanese cinematographers
People from Gunma Prefecture
California State University, Long Beach alumni
AFI Conservatory alumni
Japanese emigrants to the United States
Year of birth missing (living people)